Cheung Sha Wan is an area between Lai Chi Kok and Sham Shui Po in New Kowloon, Hong Kong. It is mainly residential to the north and south, with an industrial area in between. Administratively it is part of Sham Shui Po District, which also includes Lai Chi Kok.

History
As its Chinese name suggests, it was formerly a bay with a long sandy beach. It spans roughly from today's Butterfly Valley Road at the west to Yen Chow Street at the east. The beach was a gathering place for many Tanka fishermen before its development. The original shoreline approximates the present Castle Peak Road and Un Chau Street. Inland, villages of Om Yam, Ma Lung Hang, Pak Shu Lung, So Uk, Li Uk, Wong Uk and others sparsely occupied the whole bay of Cheung Sha Wan. Rivers from Beacon Hill, Crow's Nest and Piper's Hill formed a long plain behind the beach. Farmlands filled between villages. A larger river ran in Butterfly Valley separating Cheung Sha Wan and Lai Chi Kok. A sandbar was found at the mouth of its estuary.

The Lei Cheng Uk Han Tomb is located in Cheung Sha Wan, and dates from AD 25 - 220. It is the oldest known constructed structure in Hong Kong, and demonstrates that early Chinese civilisation had spread to Hong Kong by 2,000 years ago.

At the time of the 1911 census, the population of Cheung Sha Wan was 653. The number of males was 496.

Before World War I, two ends, Lai Chi Kok and Sham Shui Po, of Cheung Sha Wan had been reclaimed. The former was for military use and the later emerged as a new town north of Tai Kok Tsui.

In April 2006, a total of 580 unused shells from the Japanese occupation of Hong Kong were found buried at Tonkin Street in Cheung Sha Wan. The residents were temporarily evacuated and the shells were detonated safely.

The bay of Cheung Sha Wan was reclaimed in several phases in the twentieth century. The last reclamation in 1990s extended the area close to Stonecutters Island. The shipbuilding and repair industries on the old shore were moved to near the island and the sites were replaced by some private housing estates constructed in the early 2000s.

Economy
Cheung Sha Wan was a manufacturing centre after the war, with a number of light industries, especially textile and clothing. After the PRC implemented its open door policy in the 1980s, many factories relocated to the mainland, vacating the area's industrial buildings (some of which have since been converted into offices and warehouses). There are several wholesale markets in Cheung Sha Wan. They include Cheung San Wan Temporary Wholesale Poultry Market, Cheung Sha Wan Vegetable Wholesale Market and many wholesale clothes markets. The Vegetable Marketing Organisation's Premium Vegetable Packaging Centre also locates in central Cheung Sha Wan.

The head office of Giordano is in the Tin On Industrial Building, Cheung Sha Wan.

Housing

Private housing estates
Several of the private housing estates were built on a former site of a shipyard which was relocated owing to the commencement of the West Kowloon Reclamation, or reclaimed land adjacent to it.

Four private housing estates are collectively known as the "Four Little Dragons of West Kowloon" because each of them are similar in scale and they are located next to each other.
 Aqua Marine is a private housing estate developed on the reclaimed land by Hang Lung Properties and Korean-based Hyundai Engineering and Construction. It comprises 5 residential towers and retail podium completed in 2003.
 Banyan Garden consists of seven towers. They are among the tallest buildings in Hong Kong and the 100 tallest residential buildings in the world since the complex was completed in 2003.
 Liberté consists of seven residential towers, five of which rank among the 100 tallest buildings in the territory. Towers 1, 2 and 3 each rise , towers 5 and 6 rise  The complex was completed in late 2003.
 The Pacifica complex consists of approximately 2,000 condominiums in six residential towers, each of which rank among the 70 tallest buildings in the city. The towers, numbered 1, 2, 3, 5, 6 and 7, each rise  and 50-66 floors, Construction began in 2002 and the complex was completed in 2006.

Public housing estates

A new public housing estate named Hoi Lai Estate (formerly named Hoi Lai Court before the government turned it into a public housing estate) is located in the area and had the most expensive rental fees within the Sham Shui Po District.

Education
Cheung Sha Wan is in Primary One Admission (POA) School Net 40. Within the school net are multiple aided schools (operated independently but funded with government money) and two government schools: Fuk Wing Street Government Primary School and Li Cheng Uk Government Primary School.

Transport

MTR stations
The area is served by two stations on MTR Tsuen Wan line:
 Cheung Sha Wan station in the east and,
 Lai Chi Kok station in the west.
Lai Chi Kok station is actually located not in Lai Chi Kok, but in Cheung Sha Wan. The fact that references to Cheung Sha Wan can be found on many buildings and amenities near Lai Chi Kok station continues to be a source of confusion for many.

Bus routes
These bus routes terminate in Cheung Sha Wan, but on Cheung Sha Wan Road, Lai Chi Kok Road and Castle Peak Road there are many more routes that are available.

References

 
New Kowloon